Allen Towner Treadway (September 16, 1867 – February 16, 1947) was a Massachusetts Republican politician.

Biography
Treadway was born in Stockbridge, Massachusetts, to William Denton Treadway and Harriet (Heaton) Treadway.  Treadway graduated from Amherst College in 1886. He served in the Massachusetts House of Representatives in 1904, and President of the Massachusetts Senate from 1908 to 1911. From March 4, 1913, until January 3, 1945, he was a member of the United States House of Representatives  Treadway represented Massachusetts's first congressional district for sixteen consecutive terms.

Treadway faced Raymond Leslie Buell in the 1942 election.

Treadway died in 1947 and is buried in Stockbridge Cemetery, in his home town of Stockbridge.

Legacy
Treadway once owned the Red Lion Inn in Stockbridge, the Inn has a room named for him.

See also
 130th Massachusetts General Court (1909)
 131st Massachusetts General Court (1910)

Notes

References

1867 births
1947 deaths
Presidents of the Massachusetts Senate
Republican Party Massachusetts state senators
Republican Party members of the Massachusetts House of Representatives
People from Stockbridge, Massachusetts
Amherst College alumni
Burials in Massachusetts
Republican Party members of the United States House of Representatives from Massachusetts